The 2021 FIVB Volleyball Women's Nations League was the third edition of the FIVB Volleyball Women's Nations League, an annual women's international volleyball tournament. The 2021 version of VNL was scheduled to start earlier than the previous edition due to the 2020 Summer Olympics in July. The competition was held in between May and June 2021, and the final round took place in Rimini Fiera, Rimini, Italy.

United States won their third title in the competition, outlasting Brazil in thrilling four sets on the final. Turkey grabbed the bronze medal after sweeping Japan in three sets. Michelle Bartsch-Hackley from USA claimed her second MVP title of the tournament.

Qualification
In the 2019 edition sixteen teams qualified for the competition. Twelve of them qualified as core teams which could not face relegation. Other four teams were selected as challenger teams which could be relegated from the tournament. Canada as winner of 2019 Challenger Cup earned the right to participate in this tournament replacing Bulgaria, the last placed challenger team after the 2019 edition.

Format

Preliminary round
The 16 teams compete in a round-robin format. The teams play 3 matches each week and compete five weeks long, for 120 matches. The top four teams after the preliminary round compete in the final round. This year there won't be any promotion or relegation and the 16 participants will also compete in the 2022 edition.

Final round
The four qualified teams play knock-out round. The semifinals winners advance to compete for the Nations' League title. The losers face each other in the third place match.

Venue

Competition schedule

Pool standing procedure
 Total number of victories (matches won, matches lost)
 In the event of a tie, the following first tiebreaker will apply: The teams will be ranked by the most points gained per match as follows:
Match won 3–0 or 3–1: 3 points for the winner, 0 points for the loser
Match won 3–2: 2 points for the winner, 1 point for the loser
Match forfeited: 3 points for the winner, 0 points (0–25, 0–25, 0–25) for the loser
 If teams are still tied after examining the number of victories and points gained, then the FIVB will examine the results in order to break the tie in the following order:
Sets quotient: if two or more teams are tied on the number of points gained, they will be ranked by the quotient resulting from the division of the number of all sets won by the number of all sets lost.
Points quotient: if the tie persists based on the sets quotient, the teams will be ranked by the quotient resulting from the division of all points scored by the total of points lost during all sets.
If the tie persists based on the points quotient, the tie will be broken based on the team that won the match of the Round Robin Phase between the tied teams. When the tie in points quotient is between three or more teams, these teams ranked taking into consideration only the matches involving the teams in question.

Squads

The 16 national teams involved in the tournament were required to register a squad of 25 players, which every week's 14-player roster must be selected from. Each country must declare its 14-player roster two days before the start of each week's round-robin competition.

Preliminary round
All times are Central European Summer Time (UTC+02:00).

Ranking

|}
Source: VNL 2021 standings

Week 1
|}

Week 2
|}

Week 3
|}

Week 4
|}

Week 5
|}

Final round
All times are Central European Summer Time (UTC+02:00).

Semifinals
|}

3rd place match
|}

Final
|}

Final standing

Source: VNL 2021 final standings

Awards

 Most Valuable Player
 
 Best Setter
 
 Best Outside Hitters
 
 

 Best Middle Blockers
 
 
 Best Opposite
 
 Best Libero

Statistics leaders

Preliminary round
Statistics leaders correct as of preliminary round.

Final round
Statistics leaders correct as of final round.

See also
2021 FIVB Volleyball Men's Nations League
2019 FIVB Volleyball Women's Challenger Cup

Notes

References

External links
Fédération Internationale de Volleyball – official website
FIVB Volleyball Nations League 2021 – official website

2021
FIVB
Volleyball events postponed due to the COVID-19 pandemic
FIVB
FIVB
FIVB
International women's volleyball competitions hosted by Italy